Excellence may refer to:

Excellence (magazine), for owners and fans of Porsche cars
Excellence (pop group), a Swedish pop group
Excellence (software), a word processor for the Amiga
Excellence (yacht), launched 2019
Excellence-class cruise ship

See also

Excellency, an honorific
Excellent (disambiguation)
Excellence Canada, a not-for-profit organization
Excellence theory, a general theory of public relations
Center of excellence